Liz Greene (born 4 September 1946) is an American-British astrologer, psychologist and author. Her father was born in London, and her mother in the United States.

Career
Greene is one of the chief writers for astro.com the website for her company Astrodienst.

Greene has written several astrology books based on Jungian psychology and other forms of depth psychology, contributing to an application of astrology called Psychological astrology. She relocated to the UK, then to Zürich, Switzerland to continue her work. Since 2004 she has again been living in the UK.

In 1985 Greene started co-operating with Alois Treindl, founder of Swiss-based Astrodienst, on the development of computer-generated horoscopes, which would present a person with a chart synthesis, simulating Greene's own method of horoscope interpretation during a personal reading. Two years later, in 1987, they presented the Psychological Horoscope Analysis, which was followed by several other interpretations. Greene remains Astrodienst's most popular author.

With Howard Sasportas, Greene co-founded the Centre for Psychological Astrology in London. After Sasportas' death in 1992, astrologer Charles Harvey took over as co-director, until his death in 2000. Greene continues directing the organisation. In addition, she also directs CPA Press, a publishing company that focuses on specialist astrological works.

Greene has been one of the most consistently popular astrologers of the 20th century. Almost all of her many books remain in print. Greene became quickly famous with the publication, by Weiser, of Saturn:  A New Look at an Old Devil, in 1976, in which she applied Jungian psychology to revise the image of Saturn as a planet of misfortune, recasting it in a more Jungian image that has continued to be very popular into the 21st century.

Greene wrote a historical novel in 1980, The Dreamer of the Vine, dealing with the themes of Nostradamus and Jesus bloodline. Her remaining books have been on topics applying principles of psychoanalysis to astrology (Psychological astrology).  Many are transcripts of her lectures, and many are co-authored, especially with Howard Sasportas.

In addition to giving frequent lectures and directing a certificate programme in psychological astrology, Greene has continued to produce many books, all of which are now published by her own company, the CPA Press.  She has also co-authored, with Juliet Sharman-Burke, a deck of tarot cards, the Mythic Tarot.

Her most influential books include Saturn: A New Look at an Old Devil, and the philosophically-inclined The Astrology of Fate.  The Outer Planets & Their Cycles, The Luminaries (with H. Sasportas) and The Dark of the Soul are other examples of her work.

In April 2010 the History Department of the University of Bristol, UK, granted her a doctorate degree for her thesis 'The Kabbalah in British Occultism 1860-1940'.

References

Major publications 
Liz Greene  Astrology for Lovers  Weiser Books   
Liz Greene (1976)  Saturn:  A New Look at an Old Devil.  Samuel Weiser, Inc. York Beach, ME.   
Liz Greene (1977)  Relating:  An Astrological Guide to Living with Others on a Small Planet.  Samuel Weiser, Inc. York Beach, ME.   
Liz Greene (1981) The Dreamer of the Vine - A Novel About Nostradamus.  W.W.Norton & Co Inc. 
Liz Greene (1983) The Outer Planets & Their Cycles:  The Astrology of the Collective. CRCS Publications, Sebastopol, CA.   
Liz Greene (1984) The Astrology of Fate.  Samuel Weiser, Inc. York Beach, ME.   
Liz Greene (1987) The Puppet Master - A Novel. Arkadia. 
Liz Greene and Stephen Arroyo (1984) The Jupiter/Saturn Conference Lectures.  CRCS Publications, Sebastopol, CA.  .  (re-published as New Insights in Modern Astrology, (1991) CRCS   )
Liz Greene and Howard Sasportas (1987) The Development of the Personality.  Samuel Weiser, Inc. York Beach, ME. 
Liz Greene and Howard Sasportas (1988) Dynamics of the Unconscious.  Samuel Weiser, Inc. York Beach, ME. .
Liz Greene and Howard Sasportas (1992) The Luminaries.  Samuel Weiser, Inc. York Beach, ME.     
Liz Greene and Howard Sasportas (posthum.) (1993)  The Inner Planets.  Samuel Weiser, Inc. York Beach, ME.  
Liz Greene (1996) The Astrological Neptune and the Quest for Redemption.   Samuel Weiser, Inc. York Beach, ME.   
Liz Greene and Juliet Sharman-Burke (2001)  The Mythic Tarot.  Fireside Books, New York, NY.   .
Liz Greene (2003) The Dark of the Soul:  Psychopathology in the Horoscope.  Centre for Psychological Astrology Press, London.

Further reading
 The Mountain Astrologer: interview with Nick Campion, Feb/Mar 2002; interview December 2004 / January 2005, interview February/March 2005

External links
Centre for Psychological Astrology, London
Astrological chart of Liz Greene
Astrodienst Website

1946 births
Living people
American astrologers
People from Englewood, New Jersey
Psychological astrology
20th-century astrologers
21st-century astrologers